The 1972–73 season was FC Dinamo București's 24th season in Divizia A. With a new manager, Ion Nunweiller, Dinamo competed with Universitatea Craiova for the championship until the last day, winning the title after a defeat suffered by Craiova away at UTA. In the Romanian Cup, Dinamo was eliminated by the third division side Constructorul Galaţi.

Results

Squad 

Goalkeepers: Mircea Constantinescu (10 / 0); Constantin Eftimescu (1 / 0); Iosif Cavai (12 / 0); Adrian Rămureanu (8 / 0).
Defenders: Florin Cheran (16 / 0); Vasile Dobrău (27 / 0); Gabriel Sandu (28 / 0); Augustin Deleanu (23 / 0); Nicolae Petre (10 / 0); Alexandru Sătmăreanu (16 / 0); Vasile Cosma (6 / 1); Teodor Lucuță (5 / 0).
Midfielders:  Mircea Stoenescu (8 / 1); Cornel Dinu (23 / 2); Ion Batacliu (3 / 0).
Forwards: Mircea Lucescu (28 / 12); Radu Nunweiller (30 / 7); Florea Dumitrache (26 / 15); Florian Dumitrescu (26 / 5); Alexandru Moldovan (25 / 2); Viorel Sălceanu (17 / 2); Doru Popescu (24 / 4); Marin Roșu (2 / 0).
(league appearances and goals listed in brackets)

Manager: Ion Nunweiller.

Transfers 

Emil Dumitriu is transferred to Rapid. Teodor Lucuță is promoted from the youth team.

References 

 www.labtof.ro
 www.romaniansoccer.ro

1972
Association football clubs 1972–73 season
Dinamo
1972